The men's slalom competition of the 2015 Winter Universiade was held at Universiade slope, Sierra Nevada, Spain on February 14, 2015.

Results

Men's slalom